There are 160 municipalities in the Canton of Zürich in Switzerland.

In general, municipalities (German: Politische Gemeinden) in Switzerland are grouped in districts (Bezirke), their capital municipalities are written in bold letters.

Mergers of municipalities 
There were no changes between 1934 and 2013, but , there occurred in all nine mergers.
 2014: Bertschikon bei Attikon and Wiesendangen → Wiesendangen
 2015: Bauma and Sternenberg → Bauma
 2016: Kyburg and Illnau-Effretikon → Illnau-Effretikon
 2018: Hirzel and Horgen → Horgen
 2018: Elgg and Hofstetten → Elgg
 2019: Oberstammheim, Unterstammheim and Waltalingen → Stammheim
 2019: Hütten, Schönenberg and Wädenswil → Wädenswil
 2023: Adlikon, Andelfingen and Humlikon → Andelfingen

List of the municipalities 
There are listed the names of all the current municipalities as of 2023.

References

Notes 
Partially based on the article in the German Wikipedia.

External links 

 
Zurich
Subdivisions of the canton of Zürich